Michael John Moller (born June 16, 1962) is a Canadian former professional ice hockey right wing. He was drafted in the second round, 41st overall, by the Buffalo Sabres in the 1980 NHL Entry Draft. He played in the National Hockey League with the Sabres and Edmonton Oilers. Mike is the brother of Randy Moller.

As a player for the 1981–82 Canadian National Junior Team, he scored the gold medal winning goal against the Czech Republic in the final game; his sweater now hangs in the International Hockey Hall of Fame in Toronto.

In his NHL career, Moller appeared in 134 games. He scored fifteen goals and added twenty-eight assists.

Career statistics

Regular season and playoffs

International

Awards
 WHL First All-Star Team – 1981 & 1982

External links

1962 births
Living people
Binghamton Whalers players
Buffalo Sabres draft picks
Buffalo Sabres players
Canadian ice hockey right wingers
Edmonton Oilers players
Lethbridge Broncos players
Nova Scotia Oilers players
Rochester Americans players
Ice hockey people from Calgary